Motoyaki is a style of cooking, involving baked food topped with a mayonnaise-based sauce and served in an oyster shell. It is typically available in Japanese restaurants on the Pacific coast of Canada. Examples of motoyaki dishes are oyster motoyaki and lobster motoyaki.

In Japan 
In Japanese cuisine, a sauce called  (or  / ) is prepared by beating egg yolks and oil together just like mayonnaise, but without any vinegar. Some variants also have miso or soy sauce added. Although motoyaki is considered a traditional Japanese dish, the names motoyaki, tamagonomoto, and alike are not well known in Japan , while its variant using mayonnaise:  (or ) is far more popular.

Canadian motoyaki is similar to Japanese mayonēzuyaki in using mayonnaise, unlike Japanese "motoyaki".

Footnotes

References

External links
Oyster Motoyaki Recipe (blog)

Japanese seafood